NewsNight with Aaron Brown is a live international news program which aired on the CNN and CNN International networks from 2001 to 2005.  It aired at 10 PM ET on weeknights and was hosted by Aaron Brown. In its final year, Anderson Cooper co-hosted the show.

The show focused on investigative journalism and had a strong emphasis on interviews. It included segments such as The Whip (which quickly previewed segments from four reporters at large), On the Rise, and Segment 7.  The Morning Papers segment, known as The Rooster, featured a brief preview of compelling or interesting headlines from the next day's newspapers around the world.  The segment concluded with the weather forecast in Chicago as provided in the Chicago Sun-Times.

To cover the increased amount of news generated by Hurricane Katrina and its aftermath in September 2005, CNN expanded NewsNight to two hours and added Anderson Cooper as a co-host. (Cooper's coverage of the natural disaster elsewhere on the network had given him strong ratings.)  These changes were intended to last for the duration of the hurricane's aftermath, but CNN later announced that it would keep the new format and make Cooper a permanent co-host.

On November 2, 2005, CNN announced that it was canceling NewsNight and that Brown would leave the network. As of November 7, 2005, the timeslot was given to Cooper's show, Anderson Cooper 360°.

References

External links 
 "'Newsnight With Aaron Brown' Premieres Monday" (Time Warner press release, October 30, 2001)
 Sample CNN.com page for Newsnight with Aaron Brown (from November 10, 2004, via Internet Archive)
 CNN anchor's away
 Sure, Anderson Cooper is cute and young, but get a grip, CNN
 The NewsNighters - The 1st and best online club for Aaron Brown of CNN's NewsNight
 

CNN original programming
2001 American television series debuts
2005 American television series endings